Koatse River (also Poatse) is a stream in the Cuyuni-Mazaruni area in Guyana, South America.

A botanical survey of the Koatse River Valley was a part of the Biological Diversity of the Guiana Shield Program of the Smithsonian Institution and the New York Botanical Garden holds plant specimens of earlier collections.

References 

Rivers of Guyana

sv:Cuyuni-Mazaruni#Geografi